Trevor Swartz (born October 1, 1995) is an American soccer coach who is currently the head coach of the Claremont-Mudd-Scripps Stags.

Career
In July 2019, Swartz joined the Sacramento State men's soccer program as a volunteer assistant coach.

After spending the 2021 season as the Claremont-Mudd-Scripps Stags top assistant, Swartz was named CMS head coach on April 27, 2022.

Career statistics

Club

Notes

References

External links
 
 Trevor Swartz at Indiana University
 Trevor Swartz at DePaul University
  at Claremont-Mudd-Scripps Stags

1995 births
Living people
American expatriate sportspeople in Canada
American soccer players
Association football midfielders
College men's soccer coaches in the United States
DePaul Blue Demons men's soccer coaches
Expatriate soccer players in Canada
Greenville Triumph SC players
Indiana Hoosiers men's soccer players
People from El Dorado County, California
Sacramento State Hornets men's soccer coaches
Soccer players from Sacramento, California
Toronto FC II players
USL League One players
Claremont-Mudd-Scripps Stags and Athenas